Archie McPherson may refer to:

 Archie Macpherson (born 1937), Scottish football commentator
 Archie McPherson (footballer) (1910–1969), Scottish footballer